Rumuz-e-Bekhudi (or The Secrets of Selflessness; published in Persian, 1918) was the second philosophical poetry book of Allama Iqbal, a poet-philosopher of the Indian subcontinent. This is a sequel to his first book Asrar-e-Khudi  (The Secrets of the Self).

Introduction
Also in Persian and published in 1918, this group of poems has as its main themes the ideal community, Islamic ethical and social principles, and the relationship between the individual and society. Although he is true throughout to Islam, Iqbal recognizes also the positive analogous aspects of other religions. The Rumuz-i-Bekhudi (Secrets of Selflessness) complements the emphasis on the self in the Asrar-i-Khudi and the two collections are often put in the same volume under the title Asrar-o-Rumuz. A.J. Arberry's famous English translation of the Rumuz first appeared in 1953. Rumuz-i-Bekhudi is addressed to the world's Muslims. Iqbal sees the individual and his community as reflections of each other. The individual needs to be strengthened before he can be integrated into the community, whose development in turn depends on the preservation of the communal ego. It is through contact with others that an ego learns to accept the limitations of its own freedom and the meaning of love. Muslim communities must ensure order in life and must therefore preserve their communal tradition. It is in this context that Iqbal sees the vital role of women, who as mothers are directly responsible for inculcating values in their children.

Topics

 Preface
 Dedication to the Muslim Community
 PRELUDE: Of the Bond between Individual and Community
 That the Community is made up of the Mingling of Individuals, and owes the Perfecting of its Education to Prophethood
 The Pillars of Islam - First Pillar: the Unity of God
 That Despair, Grief and Fear are the Mother of Abominations, destroying Life; and that Belief in the Unity of God puts an end to those Foul Diseases.
 Conversation of the Arrow and the Sword
 Emperor Alamgir and the Tiger
 Second Pillar : Apostleship
 That the Purpose of Muhammad’s Mission was to found Freedom, Equality and Brotherhood among all mankind.
 The story of Bu Ubaid and Jaban, in Illustration of Muslim Brotherhood
 The Story of Sultan Murad and the Architect, in Illustration of Muslim Equality
 Concerning Muslim Freedom and the Secret of the Tragedy of Kerbela
 That since the Muhammadan Community is Founded upon Belief in One God and Apostleship, therefore it is not Bounded by Space
 That the Country is not the Foundation of the Community
 The season of the rose endures beyond
 That the Organization of the Community is only Possible through Law, and that the Law of the Muhammadan Community is the Koran
 That in Times of Decadence Strict Conformity is Better than Free Speculation
 That the Maturity of Communal Life Derives from Following the Divine Law

 That a Good Communal Character Derives from Discipline According to the Manners of the Prophet
 That the Life of the Community Requires a Visible Focus, and that the Focus of the Islamic Community is Mecca’s Sacred House
 That True Solidarity Consists in Adopting a Fixed Communal Objective, and that the Objective of the Muhammadan Community is the Preservation and Propagation of Unitarianism
 That the Expansion of Communal Life Depends upon Controlling the Forces of World Order
 That the Perfection of communal Life is Attained when the Community, like the Individual, Discovers the Sensation of Self; and that the Propagation and Perfecting of this Sensation can be Realized through Guarding the Communal Traditions
 That the Continuance of the Species Derives from Motherhood; and that the Preservation and Honouring of Motherhood is the Foundation of Islam
 That the Lady Fatima is the Perfect Pattern of Muslim Womanhood
 Address to the Veiled Ladies of Islam.
 Summary of the purport of the poem
 In Exegesis of the Sura of Pure Faith: “Say: He is God, One”
 “God, the Self-Subsistent”
 “He Begat Not, Neither Was He Begotten”
 “And There is Not Any Equal Unto Him”
 The Author's Memorial to him who is a mercy to all living beings

Notes

See also 
 Index of Muhammad Iqbal–related articles
 Armaghan-i-Hijaz
 Asrar-i-Khudi
 Bal-e-Jibril
 Bang-e-Dara
 Javid Nama
 Pas Chih Bayad Kard ay Aqwam-i-Sharq
 Payam-i-Mashriq
 Zabur-i-Ajam
 Zarb-i-Kalim

External links
 Read Online
 
 
 
 
Related Websites
 Official Website of Allama Iqbal
 Iqbal Cyber Library, Online Library
 The collection of Urdu poems: Columbia University
 Encyclopedia Britannica.
 Allama Iqbal Urdu Poetry Collection
 Allama Iqbal Searchable Books (iqbal.wiki)
 
 
 E-Books of Allama Iqbal on Rekhta
Social Media Pages
 Facebook Page of Allama Iqbal
 Twitter Account of Allama Iqbal
YouTube Channel
 YouTube Channel of Allama Iqbal

1918 poetry books
Persian poems
Islamic philosophical poetry books
Poetry by Muhammad Iqbal
Poetry collections
Persian-language books

ur:رموز بیخودی